This is the timeline of the Universe from Big Bang to Heat Death scenario. The different eras of the universe are shown. The heat death will occur in around 1.7×10106 years, if protons decay.

Timeline

Usually the logarithmic scale is used for such timelines but it compresses the most interesting Stelliferous Era too much as this example shows. Therefore, a double-logarithmic scale s (s*100 in the graphics) is used instead. The minimum of it is only 1, not 0 as needed, and the negative outputs for inputs smaller than 10 are useless. Therefore, the time from 0.1 to 10 years is collapsed to a single point 0, but that does not matter in this case because nothing special happens in the history of the universe during that time.

 

The seconds in the timescale have been converted to years by  using the Julian year.

See also

 
 
 
 
 
 
 
 
 
 
  - Timeline uses the log scale for comparison with the double-logarithmic scale in this article.

References

Big Bang to Heat Death
Astrophysics
Physical cosmology
Astronomy timelines
Big Bang